The Adventures of Bill Lance is a 30-minute radio crime drama, created by J. Donald Wilson, which aired on two networks in two runs between 1944 and 1948.

Initially heard on CBS West Coast Sundays at 9 p.m., the series began April 23, 1944, with John McIntire as Bill Lance, a detective who traveled to exotic locales. Pat McGeehan took over the role the following March until the series ended September 9, 1945. Howard McNear played Lance's pal, Ulysses Higgins. Others in the cast included Mercedes McCambridge, Cathy Lewis, Joseph Kearns and Frank Graham. The announcers were Dick Joy and Owen James. Milton Charles supplied the music. The program was sponsored by Planters peanuts.

With Gerald Mohr in the title role, the series returned on ABC June 14, 1947 (the first time it was broadcast nationwide), airing Saturdays at 9pm until August, then Mondays at 9 p.m. until September, then Sundays at 5 p.m. Produced by Dwight Hauser, with music by organist Rex Koury, this series ran until January 4, 1948.

References

External links
Thrilling Detective: Bill Lance
Network radio schedule for April 13, 1946

1940s American radio programs
American radio dramas
1944 radio programme debuts
1948 radio programme endings
CBS Radio programs
ABC radio programs
Detective radio shows